The Cervinae or the Old World deer, are a subfamily of deer. Alternatively, they are known as the plesiometacarpal deer, due to their ankle structure being different from the telemetacarpal deer of the Capreolinae.

Classification and species
The following species are recognised in extant genera:

 Tribe Muntiacini
 Genus Elaphodus
 Tufted deer (E. cephalophus)
 Genus Muntiacus
 Bornean yellow muntjac (M. atherodes)
 Hairy-fronted muntjac (M. crinifrons)
 Fea's muntjac (M. feae)
 Gongshan muntjac (M. gongshanensis)
 Indian muntjac (M. muntjak)
 Sumatran muntjac (M. montanum)
 Pu Hoat muntjac (M. puhoatensis)
 Leaf muntjac (M. putaoensis)
 Reeves's muntjac (M. reevesi)
 Roosevelt's muntjac (M. rooseveltorum)
 Truong Son muntjac or Annamite muntjac (M. truongsonensis)
 Giant muntjac (M. vuquangensis)
 Tribe Cervini ("true" deer)
 Genus Dama
 Common fallow deer (D. dama)
 Persian fallow deer (D. mesopotamica)
 Genus Axis
 Chital (A. axis)
 Calamian deer (A. calamianensis)
 Bawean deer (A. kuhlii)
 Indian hog deer (A. porcinus)
 Genus Rucervus
 Barasingha (R. duvaucelii)
 Eld's deer (R. eldii)
 †Schomburgk's deer (R. schomburgki)
 Genus Elaphurus
 Père David's deer (E. davidianus)
 Genus Rusa 
 Visayan spotted deer or Prince Alfred's deer (R. alfredi)
 Philippine deer or Philippine sambar (R. mariannus)
 Javan rusa deer (R. timorensis)
 Sambar (R. unicolor)
 Genus Cervus
 Thorold's deer (C. albirostris)
 Elk or American wapiti (C. canadensis)
 Red deer (C. elaphus)
 Central Asian red deer (C. hanglu)
 Sika deer (C. nippon)

Extinct genera
†Amphiprox
†Candiacervus
†Cervavitus
†Croizetoceros
†Dicrocerus
†Eucladoceros
†Euprox
†Haploidoceros
†Heteroprox
†Megaceroides
†Megaloceros
†Praemegaceros
†Pseudodama
†Sinomegaceros

References 

 
Deer
Taxa named by Georg August Goldfuss
Mammal subfamilies